The Queens Royals are the athletic teams that represent Queens University of Charlotte, located in Charlotte, North Carolina, in NCAA intercollegiate sporting competitions. On July 1, 2022, the Royals began a four-year transition from NCAA Division II to Division I as new members of the ASUN Conference. Before then, Queens had competed in the South Atlantic Conference for 14 of their varsity sports; the men's and women's swimming and diving teams competed in the Bluegrass Mountain Conference and the men's and women's indoor track and field and men's volleyball teams competed as independents. Queens had been a member of the SAC since 2013, when it moved from Conference Carolinas.

On May 7, 2022, Queens announced it had accepted an invitation from the ASUN Conference and would join that league on July 1. The ASUN officially announced this move three days later. The men's volleyball team is playing the 2023 season (2022–23 school year) as an independent before joining the Midwestern Intercollegiate Volleyball Association in July 2023.

Conference affiliations 
 Conference Carolinas (1995–2013)
 South Atlantic Conference (2013–2022)
 ASUN Conference (2022–present)

Varsity teams
Sports not governed by the NCAA are indicated with a yellow background.

In addition to the listed sports, Queens considers its cheerleaders, both male and female, as well as its all-female dance team, to be varsity athletes.

National championships
The Royals have won eleven NCAA Division II team national championships.

Teams

Facilities

Levine Center for Wellness and Recreation
The Levine Center for Wellness and Recreation is located on campus and contains Curry Arena, the aquatic center, as well as office and practice space. The facility is home to the basketball, swimming & diving, volleyball, and wrestling programs and was built in 2012 to replace the Ovens Athletic Center.

Queens University of Charlotte Sports Complex at Marion Diehl Park
A joint project of Queens University of Charlotte and Mecklenburg County Parks & Recreation, the Sports Complex is home to Dickson Field, a 2,000-seat stadium that serves as home to the lacrosse, rugby, and soccer teams, Bessant Field, which hosts the field hockey program and also contains an 8-lane track, a tennis complex, and several community facilities. A notable feature of the complex is Rex, the world's largest standing lion statue.

References

External links